Kellerberrin is a town in the Wheatbelt region of Western Australia,  east of Perth on the Great Eastern Highway. The town serves as a stop on the Prospector and MerredinLink rural train services.  It is also located on the Golden Pipeline Heritage Trail.

History

Early settlers from 1890 to 1910 from Ireland settled in the area of Kellerberrin and Wittem. Their family name was English. A road was named after this family. The railway line from Northam to Southern Cross was constructed through here in 1893–94, and this section opened for traffic in 1895. Kellerberrin was one of the original stations when the line opened. By 1898 there was a demand for small blocks of land in the area, and the government surveyed a number of  lots the same year. The area was gazetted as Kellerberrin townsite in 1901, and the government soon made more land available for settlers.

In 1898 the Agricultural Hall was officially opened. It was built with granite walling and brick dressing with a jarrah and iron roof. The building is located on the north side of the railway line, adjoining the post office. The hall is now used as a folk museum.

In 1932 the Wheat Pool of Western Australia announced that the town would have two grain elevators, each fitted with an engine, installed at the railway siding.

The surrounding areas produce wheat and other cereal crops. The town is a receival site for Cooperative Bulk Handling.

Etymology
The name Kellerberrin is Aboriginal, and is derived from the name of a nearby hill. The hill was first recorded as "Killaburing Hill" by an explorer in 1861, but in 1864 the explorer Charles Hunt recorded it as Kellerberrin Hill. One source claims that Kellerberrin is the name for the fierce ants that are found in the area, while another gives it as meaning "camping place near where rainbow birds are found" – kalla means camping place or place of, and berrin berrin is the rainbow bird.

Climate
Kellerberrin has a semi-arid climate with hot dry summers and slightly wet winters.

Rail services
Transwa's MerredinLink and Prospector services stop at Kellerberrin, at least one service each day.

Notable people
Kellerberrin is the birthplace of:

 Barbara York Main (1929–2019) – Australian arachnologist, author, and adjunct professor at the University of Western Australia.
 Jessie Pengilly (1918–1945) – world record holding road and track cyclist
 Derek Kickett – Australian rules footballer former player for North Melbourne, Essendon and Sydney. Won 1987 Sandover Medal.
 Byron Pickett – Australian rules footballer acknowledged as one of the finest Aboriginal players in the history of the game, played for Port Adelaide (SAFL), North Melbourne, Port Adelaide (AFL) and Melbourne. Won 2004 Norm Smith Medal.
 Peter Walsh (1935–2015) – Australian Senator, served as Minister for Resources and Energy and Finance Minister
 Nicky Winmar – Australian rules footballer, played for South Fremantle, St Kilda and Western Bulldogs.

See also
 The Avon Gazette and York Times

References

External links

Towns in Western Australia
Grain receival points of Western Australia